Stacey Keating (born 21 June 1986) is an Australian golfer who won the 2012 Open de France Dames and 2012 Open De España Femenino.

Originally from Werneth, near Colac, Victoria, she and competed at the 2013 U.S. Women's Open, where she missed the cut.

Keating won twice on the Ladies European Tour in 2012 and finished sixth on the Order of Merit.

In December 2013, Keating earned conditional status on the LPGA Tour for the 2014 season by finishing tied for 38th place at the final stage of Q-school.

Amateur wins
2006 Victorian Women's Amateur Championship
2007 Irish Women's Open Stroke Play Championship
2008 Canadian Women's Amateur
2010 Australian Women's Amateur, Victorian Women's Amateur Championship

Professional wins (9)

Ladies European Tour wins (2)
2012 (2) Open de France Dames, Open De España Femenino

ALPG Tour wins (7)
2011–12 (2) Hahn Premium Light & Konami Port Kembla Golf Club Pro-Am, Mount Broughton Ladies Classic
2012–13 (2) The Vintage Golf Club Pro-Am, Women's Victorian Open
2015–16 (3) Anita Boon Pro Am, Bing Lee Fujitsu General Pro Am, Brisbane Invitational

Team appearances
Amateur
Espirito Santo Trophy (representing Australia): 2010
Tasman Cup (representing Australia): 2008 (winners), 2009
Queen Sirikit Cup (representing Australia): 2009, 2010

Professional
The Queens (representing Australia): 2016

References

External links

Australian female golfers
ALPG Tour golfers
Ladies European Tour golfers
LPGA Tour golfers
Sportswomen from Victoria (Australia)
Sportspeople from Ballarat
Living people
1986 births